Piranha (also known as Piranhas) is a 1995 American made-for-television horror film directed by Scott P. Levy. It is about a school of killer piranhas descending upon the bustling Lost River Lake Resort. Executive produced by Roger Corman for the Showtime network, the film is a remake of the 1978 film of the same name and part of the Piranha film series. The film features Mila Kunis in her debut role.

Plot
During the night, Barbara (Lorissa McComas) and her boyfriend David (Richard Israel) sneak into a closed down US Army test site, and discovered a pool. They go swimming, but are attacked and killed by an unseen force in the pool. The next day, J.R. Randolph (Monte Markham) the uncle of Barbara, hires private investigator Maggie McNamara (Alexandra Paul), to investigate the incident, believing her to be a runaway.

Maggie searches the area for any possible witnesses, eventually stopping by local homeowner Paul Grogan (William Katt), asking for any knowledge of the girl's disappearance. He claims to have not seen her, but leads her to the army test site where they discover the pool. They enter to look for any clues, until Maggie thinks they should drain the pool. As she starts the draining, a scientist named Dr. Leticia Baines (Darleen Carr), encounters them and attacks Maggie and Paul to stop the draining, but is too late to do so. They investigate the bottom of the pool and discover a skeleton, which they believe is that of a dog. Baines steals the jeep, but crashes after losing consciousness.  Later that night, she wakes up and informs them that a school of piranha lived in the pool that they had drained, and are assumed to be headed to the river.

Paul, knowing his daughter Susie (Mila Kunis) was at a scout camp just downstream of the river joins Maggie and Paul to visit Randolph and try to convince him to shut down a grand opening of a resort just downstream. They fail, and have to make many twists and turns to try and save people downstream. On the way to warn people of the piranha, Maggie and Paul are arrested after Randolph had claimed that they lied about the piranha, dismissing it as "nonsense". They eventually escape from custody to warn the people of Lost River.

The piranha first make their way to the camp, attacking the kids. Susie takes a raft and saves her friend Darlene. Darlene tries to save Laura (Soleil Moon Frye) but she falls in and the piranha kills her. Maggie and Paul make it to the camp. Paul grabs a canoe and saves his daughter and the kids. Maggie calls the resort to warn them of the danger but is ignored. She and Paul drive to the resort themselves but arrive too late; the school of piranha having killed most of the swimmers. Randolph now sees and realizes his mistake.

Maggie and Paul take a speedboat to the latter's old workplace, to open the valve containing toxins and spread them into the lake, in attempts to kill the piranha. Upon arrival, the control room is flooded, and Paul must swim under to it and release the valve while Maggie stays in the boat counting to 200 before pulling him out. The piranha attacks Paul but he successfully releases the valve, spreading the toxins. Maggie starts the boat's engines, pulling Paul away from the piranha school. As Maggie pulls out the rope, she discovers that it was cut loose, making her think that Paul did not make it. A badly wounded but alive Paul surfaces from the water. J.R. Randolph then commits suicide after he discovers that he will face legal action.

After the horrific incident, the Mayor of Lost River announcing that the piranha somehow are all dead, but then at the ocean the trilling sounds of the piranha are heard, and it turns out that half of the piranha have survived and made their way to the ocean.

Cast
 Alexandra Paul as Maggie McNamara
 William Katt as Paul Grogan
 Darleen Carr as Dr. Leticia Baines
 Soleil Moon Frye as Laura Dickinson
 James Karen as Governor
 Mila Kunis as Susie Grogan
 Kehli O'Byrne as Gina Green
 Richard Israel as Dave
 Kaz Garas as Sheriff
 Leland Orser as Terry Wechsler
 Ben Slack as Earl Lyon
 James E. Brodhead as Jack
 Monte Markham as J.R. Randolph 
 Lorissa McComas as Barbara Randolph

Production
Rather than shoot new special effects for the film, executive producer Roger Corman recycled the special effects from the original. The screenplay is nearly identical to that of the original, but removes all of the humor and comedy. The original film’s director, Joe Dante and producer,  Jon Davidson, expressed a dislike for the film in the audio commentary on the DVD for the original.

References

External links

 
 
 Piranha at Letterbox DVD

1995 films
1995 horror films
1995 television films
Remakes of American films
American natural horror films
Films about piranhas
Horror film remakes
American horror television films
Films scored by Christopher Lennertz
Showtime (TV network) films
Films directed by Scott P. Levy
1990s American films